The 1st constituency of Oise is a French legislative constituency in the Oise département.

Description

The 1st constituency of the Oise lies in the north of the department and includes the northern portion of its prefecture Beauvais.

Since 1988 the seat has been held by one man Olivier Dassault with the exception of between 1997 and 2002 when it was captured by the Socialist Party. Olivier Dassault was the third generation of his family to have held elected office with his father Serge Dassault being a Senator and his grandfather Marcel Dassault being a Deputy between 1951 and 1986. Marcel Dassault was the founder of Dassault Group a large French industrial conglomerate

After Olivier Dassault died on 7 March 2021 the position was vacant until his nephew won the by-election in June 2021.

Historic Representation

Election results

2022

 
 
 
 
 
|-
| colspan="8" bgcolor="#E9E9E9"|
|-

2021 by-election

 
 
 
 
 
 
|-
| colspan="8" bgcolor="#E9E9E9"|
|-

2017

2012

 
 
 
 
|-
| colspan="8" bgcolor="#E9E9E9"|
|-

Sources
Official results of French elections from 2002: "Résultats électoraux officiels en France" (in French).

1